Palmdale High School is located in Palmdale, California and is part of the Antelope Valley Union High School District. About 4,000 students attend Palmdale High School in grades 9 through 12. Palmdale High School was founded in 1956.

Notable alumni
Josh Shaw, professional football player 
Afroman American Rapper/singer/songwriter/preacher
Steve Knight, American politician, military veteran and police officer
Randy Kutcher, professional baseball player
Dana Eveland, professional baseball player
Michael Tonkin, professional baseball player
Derek Hagan, professional football player
Tyrone Culver, professional football player
 Larenz Tate, actor
Davon House, professional football player 
Eugena Washington, model

References

External links

High schools in Los Angeles County, California
Public high schools in California
Educational institutions established in 1956
1956 establishments in California
All articles with unsourced statements